Happy Family, The Happy Family, or A Happy Family may refer to:

Film 
 Happy Family (1934 film) or The Merry Frinks, an American comedy directed by Alfred E. Green
 A Happy Family, a 1935 Krazy Kat animated short
 The Happy Family (1936 film), a British comedy directed by Maclean Rogers
 The Happy Family (1952 film), a British comedy directed by Muriel Box
 Happy Family (2002 film), a Hong Kong film directed by Herman Yau
 Happy Family (2006 film) or 'N Beetje Verliefd, a Dutch comedy film directed by Martin Koolhoven
 Happy Family (2010 film), an Italian film directed by Gabriele Salvatores
 Happy Family (2017 film) or Monster Family, a German-British computer-animated film directed by Holger Tappe

Music
 The Happy Family (band), a 1980s Scottish post-punk band
 Happy Family (Japanese band), a progressive rock band

Television 
 Happy Family (American TV series), a 2003 sitcom
 Happy Family (Singaporean TV series), a 2010 drama
 Happy Family (Chinese TV series), an animated series produced by Creative Power Entertaining
 "Happy Family" (Law & Order: Criminal Intent), an episode

Other uses 
 Happy Family (food company), an American organic baby-food company
 Happy Family (group theory), the sporadic groups that are subquotients of the Monster group
 The Happy Family (painting), a 1668 painting by Jan Steen
 "The Happy Family" (fairy tale), a story by Hans Christian Andersen

See also 
 Happy Families (disambiguation)